Qatar Airways is the flag carrier of Qatar, and operates flights from its home of Doha Hamad International Airport to more than 90 countries on every inhabited continent.

List

References 

Lists of airline destinations
Oneworld destinations
Qatar Airways

id:Bandara-bandara Tujuan Qatar Airways